Crudup is a surname. Notable people with the surname include:

 Arthur Crudup (1905–1974), Delta blues singer-songwriter and guitarist
 Billy Crudup (born 1968), American actor
 Byrd D. Crudup (1897–1960), American football and basketball coach
 Derrick Crudup (born 1965), American football player
 Jevon Crudup (born 1972), American basketball player and coach
 Josiah Crudup (1791–1872), U.S. Congressman
 Ronnie Crudup Jr. (born 1977), American politician